William Morris Hick (13 February 1903–1972) was an English footballer who played in the Football League for Bristol City, Exeter City, Hartlepools United, Middlesbrough, Rotherham United and Southend United.

References

1903 births
1972 deaths
English footballers
Association football forwards
English Football League players
Hartlepool United F.C. players
Gateshead A.F.C. players
Middlesbrough F.C. players
Southend United F.C. players
Bristol City F.C. players
Exeter City F.C. players
Grays Athletic F.C. players
Scunthorpe United F.C. players
Notts County F.C. players
Rotherham United F.C. players